Pterygopleurum is a genus of flowering plants belonging to the family Apiaceae.

Its native range is Eastern China to Japan.

Species:
 Pterygopleurum neurophyllum (Maxim.) Kitag.

References

Apiaceae
Apiaceae genera